Jean-Marc Gaillard (born 7 October 1980) is a French cross-country skier who has been competing since 2000. His best finish at the FIS Nordic World Ski Championships was seventh in the 50 km event at Sapporo in 2007. At the 2010 Winter Olympics in Vancouver, Gaillard had his best finish of fourth in the 4 × 10 km relay as well.

Cross-country skiing results
All results are sourced from the International Ski Federation (FIS).

Olympic Games
 2 medals – (2 bronze)

World Championships
 1 medals – (1 bronze)

World Cup

Season standings

Individual podiums
1 victory – (1 ) 
7 podiums – (4 , 3 )

Team podiums

 3 podiums – (3 )

References

External links
 
 
 

1980 births
Living people
People from Annemasse
Cross-country skiers at the 2006 Winter Olympics
Cross-country skiers at the 2010 Winter Olympics
Cross-country skiers at the 2014 Winter Olympics
Cross-country skiers at the 2018 Winter Olympics
French male cross-country skiers
Olympic cross-country skiers of France
Medalists at the 2014 Winter Olympics
Medalists at the 2018 Winter Olympics
Olympic bronze medalists for France
Olympic medalists in cross-country skiing
Université Savoie-Mont Blanc alumni
Knights of the Ordre national du Mérite
FIS Nordic World Ski Championships medalists in cross-country skiing
Tour de Ski skiers
Sportspeople from Haute-Savoie
20th-century French people
21st-century French people